Jonathan Anthony Stroud (born 27 October 1970) is a British writer of fantasy fiction, best known for the Bartimaeus young adult sequence and Lockwood & Co. children's series. His books are typically set in an alternative history London with fantasy elements, and have received note for his satire, and use of magic to reflect themes of class struggle. The Bartimaeus sequence is the recipient of the Grand Prix de l'Imaginaire and Mythopoeic Fantasy Awards. Stroud's works have also been featured on ALA Notable lists of books for children and young adults.  In 2020, Netflix announced a TV series based on Lockwood & Co., with filming initiated in July 2021.

Biography and career
Born in 1970 in Bedford, England, Stroud began to write stories at a very young age. He grew up in St Albans where he attended Wheatfields Junior School and St Albans Boys' School. He enjoyed reading books, drawing pictures, and writing stories. He attributes his love of reading and writing to being ill between the ages of seven and nine. To escape boredom, he would occupy himself with books and stories. After he completed his studies of English literature at the University of York, he worked in London as an editor for the Walker Books store. During the 1990s, he started publishing his own works and quickly gained success.

Among his works are the best-selling Bartimaeus Trilogy, which has received note for its satire and use of magic to explore themes of class struggle. By narrating the story from the perspective of Bartimaeus, a sarcastic and slightly egomaniacal djinni, Stroud examines the stereotypes and ethics of the magician class and the enslaved demons. The books in this series, his first to be published in the United States, are The Amulet of Samarkand, The Golem's Eye, Ptolemy's Gate, and prequel The Ring of Solomon.

In 2013, the first book in the Lockwood & Co (which is about a ghost hunter agency in a ghost-ravaged England) series, Lockwood & Co.: The Screaming Staircase was released, and achieved critical acclaim, with Rick Riordan calling Stroud a "genius". The second book, The Whispering Skull, was released in September 2014. A third novel, titled The Hollow Boy, was announced through a competition orchestrated by Stroud, asking readers to send in an idea for a ghost to feature in the third story. The fourth book, The Creeping Shadow, was published in 2016, and the last book in the series, The Empty Grave, was published in 2017.

In late 2020, Netflix announced that Stroud's Lockwood & Co. series would be made into a television show produced by Nira Park, Rachael Prior, and Joe Cornish. Filming began in July 2021 in London.

His new series, The Outlaws Scarlett and Browne, which currently consists of two books, is about two outlaws and their infamous heists.

Personal life

Stroud lives in St Albans, Hertfordshire, with his wife Gina and their three children.

Bibliography

Fiction (Solo)

Children's literature

Novella

Teen and YA

Heroes of the Valley was featured on the VOYA Magazine's Perfect Tens list in 2009.

Non-fiction

Fiction (YA series)

Bartimaeus Sequence

The Amulet of Samarkand was given a starred review by Booklist and Publishers Weekly in 2003, recommended on Texas Lone Star's YA reading list in 2005, and given commendation for Great Graphic Novels for Teens in 2011.

Lockwood & Co.

The Screaming Staircase has been recommended by Capitol Choices: Noteworthy Books for Children and Teens (audiobook) and Children and Teens (ten to fourteen) (2014); Texas Lone Star Reading List (2014); Cooperative Children's Book Center (2014); Look! Hoo's Reading (2014), and Amazing Audiobooks for Young Adults (2014). The Whispering Skull was selected by the CCBC Choices (2015) and the Junior Library Guild (2015) and was given a starred review by Booklist (2014), Kirkus (2014), and School Library Journal (2014). The Hollow Boy was selected by the CCBC Choices (2016) and the Junior Library Guild (2016) and was given a starred review by Booklist (2015) and School Library Journal (2015). The Creeping Shadow was given a starred review by Booklist (2016) and was selected by the Junior Library Guild as their mystery/adventure novel of 2017. The Empty Grave was given a starred review by Booklist in 2017.

The Outlaws Scarlett and Browne

Awards and honours

Bartimaeus sequence

Lockwood & Co.

Other works

References

External links

 
 

 
 

1970 births
Living people
British children's writers
British fantasy writers
Alumni of the University of York
People from Bedford
People from St Albans
English male novelists